Cameron Michael Neely (born June 6, 1965) is a Canadian professional ice hockey executive and former player. Neely played right wing for the Vancouver Canucks and Boston Bruins of the National Hockey League (NHL) from 1983 to 1996. Nicknamed "Bam-Bam Cam", he was one of the most dominant power forwards of his generation.
Neely was inducted into the Hockey Hall of Fame in 2005. He currently serves as the president of the Bruins.

Playing career
Neely played hockey with the Ridge Meadows Hockey Association for the majority of his minor career and has been named to the Maple Ridge honourable people list. With the Portland Winter Hawks of the Western Hockey League he led the team to the Memorial Cup Championship, becoming the first US-based team to claim the Cup. Neely was drafted by the Vancouver Canucks ninth overall in the 1983 entry draft and played three seasons with them.

Boston Bruins
On his 21st birthday in June 1986, Neely was traded along with Vancouver's first pick, third overall in the 1987 NHL Entry Draft (used to take Glen Wesley) to the Boston Bruins for Barry Pederson. Canucks head coach Tom Watt was not impressed with Neely's defence, and that was what made him tradeable. Neely said "I was playing behind Stan Smyl and Tony Tanti, so I didn't see a lot of ice time, and, certainly not on the power plays."

Almost immediately, it became apparent that the Bruins had received the better of the deal. Neely stated that "I was surprised at the trade. I really didn't know what to expect once I got to Boston and had no idea that my career would turn out the way it did for those ten years. From Day One in training camp, I just wanted to get the opportunity to play. The coaches said, 'Let's see what he can do.' As time went by, I got more and more confidence. I never really thought I'd be a 50-goal scorer, but I was given a chance to contribute offensively, not just physically."

In his first full season following the trade, Neely's 36 goals led the club, and his 72 points more than doubled his previous year's performance. In the same season, he also spent 143 minutes in the penalty box

Mike Milbury said, 'I want you to think about what you're doing by putting yourself into the penalty box. If you're going to fight, make sure it's on your terms and not just because someone is challenging you.' He was trying to make me understand who I was going in the box with. He'd say, 'I don't want to take away from you dropping your gloves, but, I don't want you to think about not doing it. I just want you to think about how your reaction affects both their team and our team.' So it got me to thinking a little more about my role. Then, I began going with my instincts more and what felt right at that moment.

Neely's success stemmed largely from his hard, accurate shot, quick release, and his willingness to engage in the more physical aspects of the game. At 6 ft 1 in and 215 lb, Neely was as devastating with his body checks and fists as he was with his goal scoring exploits. He became the archetype of the power forward and earned the nickname "Bam-Bam Cam".

On May 5, 1991, during Game 3 of the 1991 Prince of Wales Conference Finals, Neely was checked by Ulf Samuelsson, and injured on the play, and was hit again to the knee in game 6. Compounding the situation was the fact that Neely developed myositis ossificans in the injured area. The injury kept Neely out of all but 22 games of the next two seasons, and Neely would only play a total of 162 NHL games for the remainder of his career after the hit because of knee trouble.

In the 1993–94 season, Neely scored his 50th goal in his 44th game; only Wayne Gretzky has scored 50 goals in fewer games. This milestone is unofficial as the 50 goals must be scored in the first 50 games the team plays, counting from the start of the season. Other players have also "unofficially" reached this milestone, such as Alexander Mogilny, Jari Kurri, and Bobby Hull. He was regularly listed as a healthy scratch in alternate games in order to rest his ailing knee, but it would be a degenerative hip condition that forced Neely to retire after the  season at the age of 31.

In one memorable incident in 1994, the tip of Neely's right pinky finger was cut off through his glove, requiring 10–15 stitches to repair.  After sustaining the injury early in the second period, Neely received the stitches, and returned to the game later that period. Neely scored an assist, but the Bruins ultimately lost the game against the Devils 2–1.

Neely's intense efforts to come back time and again from his devastating injuries were recognized with his winning of the Masterton Trophy after the 1993–94 season. The Bruins have since retired #8 in his honor, making him the tenth player to have a number retired by the team. Despite his shortened career, he recorded some remarkable scoring feats. Only Gretzky, Mario Lemieux, and Brett Hull scored a better goals per game average over the course of an NHL season than Neely did with his 50-goals-in-49-games in the 1993–94 season (despite missing 35 games that season). Also, only ten players in NHL history scored a better goals per game average over their career than Neely.  He reached the fifty goal mark three times, played in five All-Star games, and was named the league's Second Team All-Star at right wing in 1988, 1990, 1991, and 1994. 

As of June 1, 2021, Neely is the Boston Bruins' all-time leading playoff goal scorer with 55.  He ranks tenth in playoff points for Boston with 87.

Post-NHL
In November 1998, Neely attempted a comeback after being out of hockey for two years. Neely said this in a 2008 interview about it:

I wish that my lungs felt as good as my hip. If I last four days (of practice) in a row and my hip's barking at me, then that's all she wrote. I know how I felt when I had to retire and I know how I'm feeling now. It's not really how I want to feel. It was fun while I was out there but each day I skated, the pain just kind of lingered a lot longer than I would have liked. I was feeling really good and had started getting some different treatment. I practiced a few times with the Bruins but after some really hard practices, realized there was just no way I could continue.

Neely was inducted into the Hockey Hall of Fame in 2005. He said "To be honest, I never concerned myself too much with the Hall of Fame, just like I never concerned myself with numbers when I played," he said. "I just tried to do my best and work hard. Whether I played well or not was another story."

On September 25, 2007, Neely was appointed vice president of the Boston Bruins, and was named president of the team on June 16, 2010. On Wednesday, June 15, 2011, Neely returned to British Columbia as the Bruins faced the Canucks in the first Stanley Cup Finals Game 7 in Bruins history and watched the Bruins win 4–0 to win their first Stanley Cup since 1972, allowing Neely to lift the Cup after it had eluded him as a player.

Neely also played in the Alumni Game of the 2016 Winter Classic at Gillette Stadium against the Montreal Canadiens Alumni on a Bruins Alumni team including Bourque, Mark Recchi and Terry O'Reilly and coached by, among others, Mike Milbury, Lyndon Byers and Don "Grapes" Cherry.

Personal life
Neely was born in Comox, British Columbia and grew up in Maple Ridge, British Columbia. Both of his parents died of cancer. Neely remains active in the Cam Neely Foundation run in conjunction with Tufts Medical Center, where patients and their families avail themselves of accommodation at the "Neely House" while undergoing cancer treatments. After his mother died of cancer in 1987 and his father in 1993, he founded the charity in 1995 and that same year asked Denis Leary if he were interested in orchestrating a Boston-based comedy benefit show, which became the annual Comics Come Home event.

One of Neely's childhood friends is former Major League Baseball (MLB) Hall of Fame right fielder Larry Walker, who himself dreamed of an NHL career as a goaltender.  Neely and Walker constantly played against one another to sharpen their skills.

Neely has been married to his wife Paulina Neely since 1996 and has two children, a son Jack who was born in 1998, and a daughter Ava who was born in 2000 . He sits on the board of directors of Whistler Blackcomb Holdings Inc., which was created by an IPO by Intrawest Corp. on November 1, 2010. Within that board, he is a member of the Corporate Governance and Nominating Committee.

Career statistics

Awards, honors and achievements 

 CHL Memorial Cup champion — 1983.
 Won the Seventh Player Award — 1987, 1994
 NHL All-Star Game — 1988, 1989, 1990, 1991, 1996
 Bruins Three Stars Awards — 1988, 1989, 1990, 1991, 1994, 1995
 Won the Elizabeth C. Dufresne Trophy — 1988, 1991, 1995
 Named to the NHL Second All-Star team — 1988, 1990, 1991, 1994
 Won the Bill Masterton Memorial Trophy — 1994
 His #8 Jersey is retired by the Boston Bruins.
 Inducted into the Hockey Hall of Fame in 2005.
 Won the Lester Patrick Trophy — 2010
 Stanley Cup champion — 2011 (As Boston Bruins President)

Filmography
Neely has appeared on Denis Leary's series Rescue Me, playing a hockey-playing firefighter who wreaks havoc during a NYPD vs. FDNY game. He made a cameo in the eighth-season opening episode of Cheers, titled "The Improbable Dream," as a bar patron.

Neely and Lyndon Byers had a cameo for Boston-based band Extreme in their video for the song "Hole Hearted" where they are seen playing a guitar alongside the band. Most famously, Neely portrayed the character of Sea Bass in the Jim Carrey films: Dumb and Dumber; Me, Myself & Irene; and Dumb and Dumber To; all directed by the Farrelly brothers. He had a small role as himself in the second film of the Mighty Ducks trilogy D2: The Mighty Ducks.

See also
 50 goals in 50 games
 Hockey Hall of Fame
 Power forward (ice hockey)

References

External links

1965 births
Living people
20th-century Canadian male actors
21st-century Canadian male actors
Bill Masterton Memorial Trophy winners
Boston Bruins executives
Boston Bruins players
Boston Bruins announcers
Canadian ice hockey right wingers
Canadian male film actors
Canadian male television actors
Canadian male voice actors
Hockey Hall of Fame inductees
Ice hockey people from British Columbia
Ice hockey people from Saskatchewan
Lester Patrick Trophy recipients
Male actors from British Columbia
Male actors from Saskatchewan
National Hockey League All-Stars
National Hockey League first-round draft picks
National Hockey League players with retired numbers
People from Comox, British Columbia
Portland Winterhawks players
Sportspeople from Moose Jaw
Stanley Cup champions
Vancouver Canucks draft picks
Vancouver Canucks players